Charni Road (formerly Churney Road, station code: CYR) is a railway station on the Western Line of the Mumbai Suburban Railway. It serves the suburb of Charni Road. The main significance of Charni Road station is that it is near the Girgaum Chowpatty beach and Marine Drive promenade, a major destination for tourists in Mumbai. It is also important because of the diamond trading industry located here, mainly in the Panchratna and Prasad chambers building near the railway station.

The word 'Charni' is derived from the Marathi  word 'Charne' (to graze), as the area was once used as a grazing ground for cattle and horses. In 1838, the British rulers introduced a 'grazing fee' which several cattle-owners could not afford. Therefore, Sir Jamshedji Jeejeebhoy spent 20,000 from his own purse for purchasing some grasslands near the seafront at Thakurdwar and saw that the starving cattle grazed without a fee in that area. In time the area became known as "Charni" meaning grazing. When a railway station on the BB&CI railway was constructed there it was called Charni Road. The BB&CI line from Back Bay to Virar opened in 1867.

There have also been some controversies during its renovation.

Today Charni road is well known for its old charm Chawls, wholesale markets of diamonds (Opera House), garments, Irani cafés traditional Maharashtrian culture (Girgaon) and also tall skyscrapers. It is not only famous for skyscrapers and chowpatty but also attracts crowds because of the religious places built in it (Mumbadevi temple) and also the famous celebration of Gudipadva and Ganesh Chaturthi festival in Girgaon. Also the famous Hinduja College of commerce and economics have been set up by Hinduja group in 1974.

For information about the area, see Charni Road.

References

Railway stations opened in 1867
Railway stations in Mumbai City district
Mumbai Suburban Railway stations
Mumbai WR railway division